Joanne "Jo" Mould (born 21 July 1970) is a British former field hockey player who competed in the 1996 Summer Olympics. She now works at Leicester Grammar School. She teaches the Prep.

References

External links
 
 

1970 births
Living people
British female field hockey players
Olympic field hockey players of Great Britain
Field hockey players at the 1996 Summer Olympics